Katherine Locke (June 24, 1910 – September 12, 1995) was a Broadway actress in the late 1930s.

Early life

She was born in Kalinkavičy, in what is now Belarus, and raised in the U.S. 
Her father, Morris Locke (Mendel Lakomowitz  ), was a Hebrew teacher and amateur writer. She was educated at Damrosch Academy as a pianist, but chose instead to become an actress.

Career

After appearing in small roles, at one time as an off-stage barking dog, her career was established by appearing in the 1937 Broadway play Having Wonderful Time, co-starring with John Garfield. She appeared in films in the 1940s and 1950s as a supporting actress. She began her film work in the late 1930s in bit parts, but she is remembered today as a stage actress. She was married to radio writer Norman Corwin.

In addition to appearing on a successful Broadway production of Hamlet playing Ophelia, her stage credits include starring with John Garfield in Having a Wonderful Time, Fifth Column with Lee J. Cobb, and Clash by Night with Tallulah Bankhead.

Filmography

References

External links

1910 births
1995 deaths
People from Kalinkavichy District
People from Rechitsky Uyezd
Emigrants from the Russian Empire to the United States
American film actresses
American stage actresses
20th-century American actresses